{{DISPLAYTITLE:C7H8O2}}
The molecular formula C7H8O2 (molar mass: 124.14 g/mol, exact mass: 124.05243 u) may refer to:

 2-Acetyl-5-methylfuran
 Methylbenzenediols
 3-Methylcatechol
 4-Methylcatechol
 Orcinol
 Hydroxymethylphenols
 Gastrodigenin
 Salicyl alcohol
 Methoxyphenols (benzenediol monomethyl ethers)
 Guaiacol
 3-methoxyphenol
 Mequinol
 Phenylmethanediol